In cutlery or kitchenware, a fork (from  'pitchfork') is a utensil, now usually made of metal, whose long handle terminates in a head that branches into several narrow and often slightly curved tines with which one can spear foods either to hold them to cut with a knife or to lift them to the mouth.

History

Bone forks have been found in archaeological sites of the Bronze Age Qijia culture (2400–1900 BC), the Shang dynasty (c. 1600–c. 1050 BC), as well as later Chinese dynasties. A stone carving from an Eastern Han tomb (in Ta-kua-liang, Suide County, Shaanxi) depicts three hanging two-pronged forks in a dining scene. Similar forks have also been depicted on top of a stove in a scene at another Eastern Han tomb (in Suide County, Shaanxi).

In Ancient Egypt, large forks were used as cooking utensils.

In the Roman Empire, bronze and silver forks were used, many surviving examples of which are displayed in museums around Europe. Use varied according to local customs, social class, and the type of food, but in earlier periods forks were mostly used as cooking and serving utensils.

Although its origin may go back to Ancient Greece, the personal table fork was most likely invented in the Eastern Roman (Byzantine) Empire, where they were in common use by the 4th century.  
Records show that by the 9th century in some elite circles of Persia a similar utensil known as a barjyn was in limited use. By the 10th century, the table fork was in common use throughout the Middle East. 
Chronographers mention the astonishment that the Byzantine princess Theophanu caused to the westerners, because she was using a fork instead of her hands when she was eating (she moved to the west because she married the Holy Roman Emperor Otto II).
In addition, according to Peter Damian, the Byzantine princess Maria Argyropoulina brought some golden forks to Venice, when she married Giovanni Orseolo, the son of the Doge Pietro II Orseolo in 1004. Damian condemned the fork as "vanity". The same story (with Maria Argyropoulina) was said about the Byzantine princess Theodora Doukaina who came to Venice to marry the Doge Domenico Selvo and used forks at the meals.

By the 11th century, the table fork had become increasingly prevalent in the Italian peninsula before other European regions because of historical ties with Byzantium and, as pasta became a greater part of the Italian diet, continued to gain popularity, displacing the long wooden spike formerly used since the fork's three spikes proved better suited to gathering the noodles. By the 14th century the table fork had become commonplace in Italy, and by 1600 was almost universal among the merchant and upper classes. It was proper for a guest to arrive with his own fork and spoon enclosed in a box called a cadena; this usage was introduced to the French court with Catherine de' Medici's entourage.
Although in Portugal forks were first used around 1450 by Infanta Beatrice, Duchess of Viseu, King Manuel I of Portugal's mother, only by the 16th century, when they had become part of Italian etiquette, did forks enter into common use in Southern Europe, gaining some currency in Spain, and gradually spreading to France. The rest of Europe did not adopt the fork until the 18th century.

The fork's adoption in northern Europe was slower. Its use was first described in English by Thomas Coryat in a volume of writings on his Italian travels (1611), but for many years it was viewed as an unmanly Italian affectation. Some writers of the Roman Catholic Church expressly disapproved of its use; St. Peter Damian seeing it as "excessive delicacy". It was not until the 18th century that the fork became commonly used in Great Britain, although some sources say that forks were common in France, England and Sweden already by the early 17th century.

The fork did not become popular in North America until near the time of the American Revolution. The standard four-tine design became current in the early 19th century.

Types of fork

 Asparagus fork
 Barbecue fork
 Beef fork: A fork used for picking up meat. This fork is shaped like a regular fork, but it is slightly bigger and the tines are curved outward. The curves are used for piercing the thin sliced beef.
 Berry fork
Bread Fork: A fork designed for serving bread from a basket or tray.
 Carving fork: A two-pronged fork used to hold meat steady while it is being carved. They are often sold with carving knives or slicers as part of a carving set.
 Cheese fork
 Chip fork: A two-pronged disposable fork, usually made out of sterile wood (though increasingly of plastic), specifically designed for the eating of french fries (chips) and other takeaway foods. From 7.5 to 9 cm long. In Germany they are known as Pommesgabel (literally "chip fork") and "currywurst fork".
 Cocktail fork: A small fork resembling a trident, used for spearing cocktail garnishes such as olives.
 Cold meat fork
 Crab fork: A short, sharp and narrow three-pronged or two-pronged fork designed to easily extract meat when consuming cooked crab.
 Dessert fork (alternatively, pudding fork/cake fork in Great Britain): Any of several different special types of forks designed to eat desserts, such as a pastry fork. They usually have only three tines and are smaller than standard dinner forks. The leftmost tine may be widened so as to provide an edge with which to cut (though it is never sharpened).
 Dinner fork
 Extension fork: A long-tined fork with a telescopic handle, allowing for its extension or contraction.
 Fish fork
 Fondue fork: A narrow fork, usually having two tines, long shaft and an insulating handle, typically of wood, for dipping bread into a pot containing sauce
 Fruit salad fork: A fork used which is used to pick up pieces of fruit such as grapes, strawberries, melon and other varies types of fruit.
 Granny fork
 Ice cream fork: A spoon with flat tines used for some desserts. See spork.
 Knork
 Meat fork
 Olive fork
 Oyster fork
 Pastry fork
 Pickle fork: A long handled fork used for extracting pickles from a jar, or an alternative name for a ball joint separator tool used to unseat a ball joint.
 Pie fork
 Relish fork
 Salad fork: Similar to a regular fork, but may be shorter, or have one of the outer tines shaped differently. Often, a "salad fork" in the silverware service of some restaurants (especially chains) may be simply a second fork; conversely, some restaurants may omit it, offering only one fork in their service.
 Sardine fork
 Spaghetti fork: A novelty fork with a metal shaft loosely fitted inside a hollow plastic handle. The shaft protrudes through the top of the handle, ending in a crank, that allows the metal part of the fork to be easily rotated with one hand while the other hand is holding the plastic handle. This supposedly allows spaghetti to be easily wound onto the tines. Electric variations of this fork have become more prevalent in modern times.
 Sporf: A utensil combining characteristics of a spoon, a fork and a knife
 Spork: A utensil combining characteristics of a spoon and a fork.
 Sucket fork: A utensil with tines at one end of the stem and a spoon at the other. It was used to eat food that would otherwise be messy to eat such as items preserved in syrup. The tine end could spear the item, while the other end could be used to spoon the syrup.
 Tea fork
 Terrapin fork: A spoon with flat tines used for some soups. See spork.
 Toasting fork: A fork, usually having two tines, very long metal shaft and sometimes an insulating handle, for toasting food over coals or an open flame.

See also
 Fork etiquette
 Knife
 Spoon
 Spork
 Table setting

References

Further reading

External links

 Cutlery of the Middle Ages and Renaissance Forks from the Greco-Roman era to the 17th century

Eating utensils
 
Ancient Egyptian technology
Ancient Roman technology
Chinese inventions